RDX Love is a 2019 Indian Telugu-language romantic action drama film directed by Shankar Bhanu and starring Payal Rajput and Tejus Kancherla.

Plot 
Alivelu works towards the welfare of her village with the help of her boyfriend, Siddu. They strive to meet the chief minister to bring him on board.

Cast 
Payal Rajput as Alivelu
Tejus Kancherla as Siddu
Adithya Menon as Giri Prakash
Aamani 
Vidyullekha as Raman
Naresh Vijaya Krishna as Narasaiah
Naresh 
Mumaith Khan as Mona David
Sivannarayana Naripeddi as Dr Paravthi
Nagineedu as Bapineedu, Chief Minister

Soundtrack 
The songs are composed by Radhan and penned by Bhaskarabhatla. In a review of the soundtrack album, Neeshita Nyayapati of The Times of India wrote that "All in all, the album of RDXLove is disappointing, considering how Radhan is capable of something much better".
"O Rabbi" - Yogi Sekhar and Sameera Bharadwaj
"I Am Sorry" -  Sai Madhav Rella
"Nee Nakashikal" - Anudeep Dev
"Love Garadi" - Sai Karthik, Priya Mali
"Adugepudu" -  Sameera Bharadwaj

Reception 
A critic from The Times of India wrote that "If the only the director believed in his concept and Payal Rajput's acting prowess as much as he did on her glamour and adult comedy". Murali Krishna C.H. of The New Indian Express opined that "Overall, RDX Love is highly avoidable, unless you like enjoying crass comedies". A critic from 123Telugu said that "On the whole, RDX Love has a good concept which is diluted by some wayward narration".

References

External links
 

2019 films
2010s Telugu-language films
Films set in Hyderabad, India
Indian romantic comedy-drama films
Indian romantic action films
Indian action comedy-drama films
2019 romantic comedy-drama films
2019 action comedy films